Domeykoa is a genus of flowering plants belonging to the family Apiaceae.

Its native range is southern Peru to northern Chile.

The genus name of Domeykoa is in honour of Ignacy Domeyko (1802–1889), Polish geologist, mineralogist and educator, and it was published in Fl. Atacam. on page 25 in 1860.

Known species:
Domeykoa amplexicaulis 
Domeykoa andina 
Domeykoa oppositifolia 
Domeykoa perennis 
Domeykoa saniculifolia

References

Azorelloideae
Apiaceae genera
Plants described in 1860
Flora of Peru
Flora of Chile